Herbert "Harry" Knell (10 November 1880 – 24 June 1936) was an Australian rules footballer who played with Collingwood in the Victorian Football League (VFL).

Notes

External links 

Harry Knell's profile at Collingwood Forever

1880 births
1936 deaths
Australian rules footballers from Victoria (Australia)
Collingwood Football Club players